Sir Henry Russell (8 August 1751 – 18 January 1836) was a British lawyer. He was made a Privy Counsellor in 1816, during the reign of George III. The Russell baronetcy of Swallowfield in Berkshire, was created in the Baronetage of the United Kingdom on 10 December 1812 for him. Russell was the Chief Justice of Bengal.

Life
Born at Dover, on 8 August 1751, he was the third son of Michael Russell (1711–1793) of Dover, by his wife Hannah, daughter of Henry Henshaw. Philip Yorke, 1st Earl of Hardwicke nominated him in 1763 to the foundation of the Charterhouse School, and he was educated there and at Queens' College, Cambridge (BA 1772, MA 1775).

Having been admitted a member of Lincoln's Inn, 20 June 1768, he was appointed about 1775 by Lord Bathurst to a commissionership in bankruptcy; and was called to the bar on 7 July 1783. In 1797 he was appointed a puisne judge in the supreme court of judicature, Bengal, and was knighted. He reached Calcutta on 28 May 1798. In 1807 he was appointed chief justice of the supreme court in place of Sir John Anstruther. On 8 January 1808, he pronounced judgment in a case that attracted much attention at the time. John Grant, a company cadet, was found guilty of maliciously setting fire to an Indian's hut. In sentencing him to death, the chief justice said: "The natives are entitled to have their characters, property, and lives protected; and as long as they enjoy that privilege from us, they give their affection and allegiance in return". Russell's house at Calcutta stood in what was later called after him, Russell Street. Here, on 2 March 1800, his wife's niece, Rose Aylmer, died. Her memory is perpetuated in a poem of that name by Walter Savage Landor.

By patent dated 10 December 1812, Russell was made a baronet. On 9 November 1813, he resigned the chief justiceship; testimony to his merits was formally recorded in a general letter from the Bengal government to the court of directors of the East India Company, dated 7 December 1813. Russell left Calcutta two days later, and on his return to England, the Company awarded him a pension of £2,000 a year. After his retirement he declined the offer from Charles Whitworth, 1st Earl Whitworth, his brother-in-law, to take a seat in Parliament, as a member for East Grinstead, a pocket borough of the Sackville family, on the grounds that he "did not choose to be any gentleman's gentleman." On 27 June 1816, Russell was sworn a member of the privy council. In 1820, he bought Swallowfield Park, Reading, and his remaining years were mainly spent there, where he died on 18 January 1836.

Family
Russell married, on 1 August 1776, Anne, the daughter of John Skinner of Lydd, Kent; Anne had died in 1780, and her son Henry died in 1781. Anne and her son are buried at Lydd, where there is a monument to her memory by Flaxman. Russell remarried on 23 July 1782, to Anne Barbara (died 1 August 1814), the fifth daughter of Sir Charles Whitworth, and sister of Charles, Earl Whitworth; and Russell, by her, had six sons and five daughters. Three of the sons entered the East India Company's services. Russell was succeeded by Sir Henry Russell, 2nd Baronet (1783–1852), who was resident at Hyderabad between 1800 and 1820, but returned to England in failing health. Sir Henry Russell, 2nd Baronet lived at Swallowfield until his death on 19 April 1852. Charles (died 1856), after leaving India, was a member of parliament for Reading; and Francis Whitworth Russell (1790–1852).

He died at Chittagong on 25 March 1852.

A monument to his memory by William Behnes exists in Swallowfield in Berkshire.

Bibliography

References

Attribution

1751 births
1836 deaths
British barristers
Baronets in the Baronetage of the United Kingdom
British India judges
Members of the Privy Council of the United Kingdom
People from Swallowfield
Alumni of Queens' College, Cambridge
People educated at Charterhouse School
Fellows of Queens' College, Cambridge
Chief Justices of the Calcutta High Court